The UK Adult Film and Television Awards (UKAFTAs) were a short-lived annual awards ceremony for the adult industry in the United Kingdom, which ran for two years from 2006 to 2008. Redzone Pictures and adult video producer Phil Black organised the awards in an attempt to promote the adult film industry in the UK.

The inaugural awards show was held on 17 November 2006 at the Hammersmith Palais, London and was hosted by adult film performer and director Ben Dover. There were around thirty award categories, honouring performance, production, and technical achievements in film, television, and the Internet. Notable award nominees included the TV series The Secret Diary of a Call Girl, starring Billie Piper, which was nominated for "Best Soft Core Production" at the 29 November 2007 Awards.

The 2008 awards were the last to be held, with one commentator, in 2013, attributing the award's demise to insufficient financial backing or bad planning and promotion.

2006 winners
Performers:
 BGAFD Best Actress Award 2006 - Natalie Heck
 Best Female Actress Of The Year - Poppy Morgan
 Best Male Actor Of The Year - Pascal White
 Best Solo Scene by a Female Performer - Donna Marie
 Best Actor in a Gay Film - Fernando
 Lifetime Achievement Award - Ben Dover
 Best Supporting Actress - Suzie Best
 The Joe Adelman Best Female Newcomer - KazB
 Best Female Performer In An Amateur Film - Tracey Lain
 Best Supporting Male Actor - Mark Sloane
 Best Male Newcomer - Keni Styles
 Best Female Overseas Actress Of The Year - Rio Mariah
 Most Outrageous Female Performance - Emma-Louise (Circus Extreme)
 Best Female Performer in a Girl/Girl Scene - Donna Marie
 Best Female Performer in an Anal Scene - Alicia Rhodes
 Best Female Actress Blow Job Sex Scene - Sandie Caine

Production:
 Best Film - For Your Thighs Only (Doll Theatre)
 Best Director - Kendo
 Best Softcore Film - Real Euro Couples (One Eyed Jack Productions)
 Best Gay Film - French Heat (Corolo Productions)
 Best Transsexual Film - Jet Set (Fringe Dweller Productions)
 Best Amateur Film - Viewers Wives 47 (Your Choice Productions)
 Best Reality Porn Film - RealPunting II (Jay Kay Production)
 Best Gonzo Production - Jim Slip
 Best Online Scene - Jim Slip
 Best Soundtrack - For Your Thighs Only (Doll Theatre)
 Best Script - For Your Thighs Only (Doll Theatre)

2007 winners
Performers:
 Best Female Actress – Carmel Moore (Hug a Hoodie)
 Best Male Actor – Keiran Lee (Various)
 Lifetime Achievement Award – Cathy Barry
 Best Actor in a Gay Film – Kyle Price (ASBO Twinks)
 Best Supporting Male Actor – Keni Styles (Porn Date)
 Best Male Newcomer – Vince Velvet (Hug a Hoodie)
 Most Outrageous Female Performance – Lolly Badcock (Xperi-mental)
 Best Female Performer in an Amateur Film – Tracy Lain (Knob the Builder)
 Best Performer in a Girl/Girl Scene – Daisy Rock (Bound Gagged and Shagged)
 Best Female Performer in an Anal Scene – Jamie Brooks (Cream Bunz)
 BGAFD Female Performer of the Year (voted for online) – Isabel Ice
 Best Female Performance in an Oral Scene – Cindy Behr (Kitty Licks)
 Joe Adelman Award for Best New Starlet – Karlie Simon (Celebrity Shag)
 Best Overseas Female Performer – Carmella Bing
 Best Supporting Actress – Cyprus Isles (Pyjama Party)

Production:
 Best Film – Bondage Thoughts (Kendo/Erotic Flesh Productions)
 Best Gay Film – Supersize (Freshwave)
 Best Amateur Film – Knob the Builder (Freddy's World)
 Best Overseas Film – Breakin 'Em In 9 (Vouyer Media)
 Best Reality Porn Film – Hug a Hoodie (Anna Span)
 Best Gonzo Production – Don’t Kiss Me, Just Fuck Me (Nickelass Productions)
 Best Softcore Production – Hug a Hoodie (Anna Span)
 Best Director – Anna Span (Hug a Hoodie)
 Best Script – Dr Screw 2 (Paul Carder/Craig Kennedy)
 Best Original Soundtrack – Murder Mystery Weekend (Bluebird)
 Best Editing – Bondage Thoughts (XL/Erotic Flesh Productions)

TV and Internet:
 Pay-Per-View Channel of the Year – Playboy TV
 Best Online Scene – Rio and David (Real Couples)
 Free-To-View Presenter of the Year – Rio Lee (Sex Station)
 Pay-Per-View Series of the Year – Bound Gagged and Shagged (John Luton/Spice Extreme)
 Free-To-View Channel of the Year – Sex Station

2008 winners
Performers:
 Lifetime Achievement Award – Marino
 Best Female Actress – Keisha Kane
 Best Male Actor – Jason Romer
 Daily Sport Actress of the Year – Rennee Richards
 Best Supporting Actress – Isabelle Ice
 Best Female Newcomer (The Joe Aldman Award) – Michelle Moist
 Best Male Newcomer – John Janes
 Female Performer of the Year (BGAFD Award) – Cate Harrington
 Best Female Performer in an Amateur Film – Geogina Baille
 Most Outrageous Female Performance – Daisy Rock
 Best Solo Scene by a Female Performer – Leigh Logan
 Transsexual Performer of the Year – Joanna Jet
 Butter Would Melt Award – Katie Price (Jordan)

Production:
 Best Film – Satanic Slut 2 (Salvation Films)
 Best Director – Anna Span (Do the Business)
 Best Softcore Production – Petra Joy (Sensual Seduction)
 Best Editing – Get Your Rocks Off (Pumpkin Films)
 Best Original Soundtrack – Spanking Tomato - Road Trip 18 Esher
 Best Script – St Teeny Cums (Wicked Films)

TV and Internet:
 Pay Per View Channel of the Year- Television X
 Free to View Channel of the Year – Bang Babes
 Best TV Presenter of the Year – Nikki Lee
 Best Online Scene – Terry Stevens for Real Couples
 Best Online Film – Strap On Sex Tape (Strictly Broadband)
 Best Online Female Actress – Cathy Barry
 Best Online Male Actor – Pascel White
 Best Online Production Company – Killagram

References

External links
 Female adult film director runs for parliament with Lib Dems

Pornographic film awards
British pornography
Adult Film and Television
Awards established in 2006
2006 establishments in the United Kingdom
2008 disestablishments in the United Kingdom